"Throw It Down" is a song by American rapper and model Dominique Young Unique. The song was released in the United Kingdom on 21 March 2014 as a digital download. The song has charted in Belgium. The song was written by Dominique Clark and produced by DJ Fresh, Benga and The Invisible Men.

Music video
A music video to accompany the release of "Throw It Down" was first released onto YouTube on 16 March 2014 at a total length of three minutes and eighteen seconds.

Track listing

Chart performance

Weekly charts

Release history

References

2014 singles
2014 songs
Dominique Young Unique songs
Songs written by Jon Shave
Songs written by George Astasio
Songs written by Jason Pebworth
Sony Music singles
Song recordings produced by the Invisible Men
Music videos directed by Philip Andelman
Song recordings produced by Benga (musician)